Maktoob was an online services company founded in Amman (Jordan). Maktoob.com was known for being the first ArabicEnglish email service provider. In 2009, Yahoo! acquired Maktoob.com, thus turning Maktoob into Yahoo!'s official arm in the MENA region. As of January 31, 2023, Yahoo! Maktoob no longer publishes content.

History

Early days
Maktoob was founded  in 1999 by Samih Toukan and Hussam Khoury who were able to introduce a webmail service with Arabic support for emails when no other free email service had such support. They also helped users who did not have Arabic keyboards or browsers that support Arabic to send and receive emails by using a virtual keyboard which was done in Java and using Java applets that had better Arabic support.

The initial flourish of Maktoob and its large user base led the company to create several services and content channels for Arab users, many of which were not found previously in Arabic format. Chatting, Greeting Cards, and simple content channels were the first to be developed internally. Since then, Maktoob diversified its services through both acquisitions and internal development to have close to 40 different channels and services.

CashU was founded to address the issue of electronic payments in the region, Souq.com as an auction and marketplace; Tahadi.com was founded to provide MMO/MMORPG games for Middle East internet users, Araby.com was an Arabic Search engine; Maktoob Research was a successful online research service founded by Tamara Deprez; and Sukar.com the first and biggest online private shopping club in the Middle East, founded by Saygin Yalcin.

Abraaj Capital acquisition
In June 2005, the UAE-based private equity house Abraaj Capital purchased 40% of the company shares in a $5 million deal. The rationale for such an acquisition (according to Abraaj's website) was that Maktoob has a large user base (claimed to be more than 4 million) and, according to marketing literature, "a dominant online payment option cashU and a strong brand name. It has established the first Arab online auction site Souq.com which will benefit from leveraging the large community network."

In April 2006, Maktoob acquired 80% of popular Arab sports website Sport4ever.com.

In December 2007, Abraaj sold its share to Tiger Global Management with an internal rate of return of 75%.

Yahoo!
In 2009, Maktoob was sold to Yahoo! for $164 million. In January 2011, email users were migrated from the @maktoob.com domain to the @yahoo.com domain.

In January 2015, Yahoo! let go half of its staff in Dubai, and it announced in December 2015 the closure of its office in Dubai, its last office in the MENA region. The move was an attempt to "streamline" Yahoo's international operations. 

The Yahoo! acquisition of Maktoob remains one of the biggest acquisitions in the region, and a success story for other entrepreneurs. Yahoo!'s money made it possible for Souq.com to develop and reach a $1 billion valuation.

Activity
Yahoo! Maktoob provides the following online services: News (Yahoo! Maktoob News), sports news (Yahoo! Maktoob Sport), a blogging platform (Yahoo! Maktoob Blog), a social network (Yahoo! Maktoob As7ab Maktoob), a bilingual online research community (Yahoo! Maktoob Research), a marriage portal (Yahoo! Maktoob Bentelhalal), a travel portal (Yahoo! Maktoob Travel) and a casual gaming platform (Yahoo! Maktoob Games).

References

 
1998 establishments in Jordan
Internet properties established in 1998
Computer companies of Jordan
Arabic-language websites
Internet service providers
Internet search engines
Yahoo! international
Companies based in Dubai
Yahoo! acquisitions